The State Register of Heritage Places is maintained by the Heritage Council of Western Australia. , 321 places are heritage-listed in the Shire of York, of which 34 are on the State Register of Heritage Places.

List
The Western Australian State Register of Heritage Places, lists the following 34 state registered places within the Shire of York:

Former places
The following place has been removed from the State Register of Heritage Places within the Shire of York:

References

York
 
York